Tilia oliveri, the Chinese white lime or Oliver's lime, is a species of flowering plant in the family Malvaceae, native to central and southeastern China. It has found use as a street tree, and does well in the United Kingdom, but is not commercially available in the United States.

References

oliveri
Trees of China
Endemic flora of China
Flora of North-Central China
Flora of South-Central China
Flora of Southeast China
Plants described in 1890